Pwllheli railway station is a railway station serving the small coastal town of Pwllheli on the Llŷn Peninsula in Gwynedd, Wales. It is the terminus of the Cambrian Coast Railway.

History 
However, the final five miles across the Llŷn Peninsula were never built. By 1865 the company had merged to become part of Cambrian Railways. When the first Pwllheli station opened on Thursday 10 October 1867 the decision to not complete the final five miles to Nefyn had already been taken. The station, which was about a half a mile from the town, became the line's terminus.

On 19 July 1909  a second station was opened near by the town centre following land reclamation that permitted the extension of the line. It had two tracks separated by an island platform with a small loading dock to the north. The layout remained unchanged until rationalisation began in September 1977.

A goods yard was developed on the site of the first station. Its turntable is now in the possession of the West Somerset Railway. The Great Western Railway (GWR) doubled the track between Pwllheli station and the goods yard in order to increase capacity. But after the goods yard was closed and both the signal boxes and the signals were removed in 1977, the double-lined section is now used as a long run-round loop for visiting charter trains. By 1987 a supermarket had been developed on the former goods yard land.

Prior to the closure of the Afon Wen to Caernarfon Line in 1964, there were two named daily express services during the summer between Pwllheli and London:
The Cambrian Coast Express ran via Machynlleth, Shrewsbury and Birmingham to London Paddington.
The Welshman ran via Caernarfon and Crewe to Euston.

In 1977 one side of the island platform was abandoned and the track was lifted (the land is now a car park). The station canopy, which was constructed by the GWR, survived intact until some glass fell out in late 1979, and it was shortened early in 1980. Today only the concourse and a short section of the platform remain covered. Pwllheli has one platform, a siding and a loop.  One of the old signal boxes also remains and is used as a covered ground frame to operate the loop points.

Facilities

The station is now unstaffed and has no ticket machine, so all tickets must be purchased on the train or prior to travel.  The main building still stands - part of it is used as a cafe and coffee shop whilst the remainder provides covered waiting accommodation.  Train running information is offered by means of digital display screens, automated announcements, timetable poster boards and a customer help point.  Step-free access is provided from the main entrance to the platform.

Services
Occasional charter services also terminate at the station. Trains run roughly every two hours on weekdays (Mon-Sat), with three departures on summer Sundays and just a single service in winter.

In November 2013, services from the station were suspended due to structural problems with the 1867 Grade II-listed wooden viaduct at Pont Briwet near . Network Rail had intended to build the new bridge alongside the current one whilst keeping the latter open, but work to drive steel piles into the riverbed to support the new viaduct caused the old one to shift and made it unsafe. As a result, the train service north of  had to be temporarily withdrawn whilst construction work continued and did not resume until the new bridge was ready. Meanwhile, a replacement bus service ran over the 22 mile (35 km) section to Harlech.  The line eventually reopened on 1 September 2014 when construction work on the rail portion of the new bridge was completed.

References

Sources

External links

 By DMU from Pwllheli to Amlwch, via Huntley Archives

Railway stations in Gwynedd
DfT Category E stations
Former Cambrian Railway stations
Railway stations in Great Britain opened in 1867
Railway stations in Great Britain closed in 1909
Railway stations in Great Britain opened in 1909
Railway stations served by Transport for Wales Rail
Pwllheli
Grade II listed buildings in Gwynedd
Grade II listed railway stations in Wales